Thomas & Friends: Misty Island Rescue is a 2010 British computer-animated fantasy adventure film and feature-length special of the British television series, Thomas & Friends. The film is produced by HIT Entertainment and animated by Nitrogen Studios.

This special takes place in between the thirteenth and fourteenth seasons of the television series.

Plot
A new Sodor Search and Rescue Centre is being built for Harold the Helicopter, Rocky the Crane, and Captain, a new lifeboat. Jobi wood from Japan is needed in order to build it. All the engines want to help deliver the Jobi wood. Thomas the Tank Engine inadvertently insults Diesel for being a diesel engine, so Diesel tries to prove himself by taking the Jobi wood, resulting in a chase between him and Thomas, and all the Jobi wood being lost in the sea after Diesel almost falls off an unfinished bridge. Thomas saves Diesel and is rewarded with visiting the rescue centre on the mainland. Being told there is no room on the boat, Thomas asks to be carried on a raft behind the boat. However, along the way, the chain to the raft snaps and, after falling asleep, Thomas wakes up only to find himself landing on a nearby island, Misty Island.

Thomas explores the island and soon finds it to be inhabited by the "Logging Locos", consisting of a large engine named Ferdinand and two small twins, Bash and Dash, who were sent to the island after causing trouble on the mainland. As Thomas continues exploring the island, Sir Topham Hatt receives a call telling him Thomas is missing, prompting him, Harold and Captain to send out a search party to find him.

After seeing the entire island, Thomas discovers a logging station which the Logging Locos are running and learns that Misty Island is the only place other than Japan that grows Jobi wood. He and the others decide they want to go back to Sodor with some of the wood and use a tunnel that connects Misty Island to Sodor. However, as they are halfway through the tunnel, the tunnel caves in on both sides, causing them to get stuck. At the same time, the Logging Locos run out of oil. Thomas finds a hole in the ceiling of the cave which gives him an idea: he can puff smoke out through the hole and alert his friends of his location. The smoke soon alerts the rest of the engines of Thomas's location, convincing his best friend Percy and the garbage dump engine Whiff to go into the tunnel. Percy alerts Thomas of his presence, convincing Thomas he should break through the caved-in rocks himself. However, Whiff sternly corrects Thomas, saying he knows the tunnel more than he does. Thomas is soon convinced, allowing Percy and Whiff to break through. The three then haul the Logging Locos out of the tunnel and take them to be fixed up. However, Sir Topham Hatt, Edward, James, and Gordon have all sailed to Misty Island in order to find Thomas, so Thomas rushes back to Misty Island and finds them just in time. Once he does, the Logging Locos are all welcomed to Sodor and there is a big celebration for the opening of the Sodor Search and Rescue Centre.

In a post-credits scene, Diesel 10, the main antagonist of Thomas and the Magic Railroad, watches the engines from above the rescue centre and vows that he will have revenge on Thomas for insulting Diesel, foreshadowing the events of the following film Day of the Diesels.

Voice cast

UK dub
 Michael Angelis as the Narrator
 Ben Small as Thomas, Ferdinand and Toby
 Matt Wilkinson as Bash, Rocky, Cranky, Victor, Kevin, the Dock Manager and Diesel 10 (post-credits scene)
 Keith Wickham as Edward, Henry, Gordon, James, Percy, Whiff, Dash, Salty, Captain, Harold and the Fat Controller
 Kerry Shale as Diesel
 Teresa Gallagher as Emily
 Togo Igawa as Hiro

US dub
 Michael Brandon as the Narrator and Diesel
 Martin Sherman as Thomas and Percy
 William Hope as Bash, Whiff, Rocky, Edward, Toby and the Dock Manager
 Kerry Shale as Henry, Gordon, James, Dash, Harold, Kevin and Sir Topham Hatt
 Jules de Jongh as Emily
 Glenn Wrage as Ferdinand and Cranky
 David Bedella as Victor
 Keith Wickham as Salty and Captain
 Togo Igawa as Hiro
 Matt Wilkinson as Diesel 10 (post-credits scene)

Reception
Common Sense Media said of the film, "For fans of Thomas & Friends, this is standard fare and follows the formula that is well established."

References

External links
 

2010 computer-animated films
2010 direct-to-video films
Thomas & Friends
British computer-animated films
Films directed by Greg Tiernan
Lionsgate animated films
Mattel Creations films
2010s English-language films
British direct-to-video films
Animated films about trains
Lionsgate films
British adventure comedy-drama films
2010s American films
2010s British films